Stankiewicz, Stankevich, or Stankievič is a Polish and Belarusian surname. It appears in various forms depending on the language.

Notable people with this surname include:

Religion
 Adam Stankievič (1882–1949), Belarusian Roman Catholic priest, politician and writer
 Antoni Stankiewicz  (born 1935-2021), Polish Roman Catholic bishop
 Aristarchus (Stankevich) (1941–2012), Belarusian Orthodox bishop
 Zbigņevs Stankevičs (born 1955), Latvian Roman Catholic archbishop

Sports
 Andy Stankiewicz  (born 1964), American retired Major League Baseball player
 Aneta Stankiewicz (born 1995), Polish sports shooter
 Brian Stankiewicz (born 1956), Austrian Olympic ice hockey player
 Eddie Stanky born Stankiewicz (1915–1999), American baseball second baseman and manager
 Ed Stankiewicz  (born 1929), Canadian retired professional ice hockey player 
 John Stankevitch (born 1979), English rugby league coach and former player
 Myron Stankiewicz  (born 1935), Canadian retired professional ice hockey player
 Teddy Stankiewicz (born 1993), American baseball pitcher 
 Tomasz Stankiewicz  (1902–1940), Polish track cyclist

Other
 Brian Levin-Stankevich, American college administrator
 Edward Stankiewicz (1920–2013), Poland born Slavic Languages and Literatures professor at Yale University
 Irena Stankiewicz (born 1925), Polish graphic artist
 Jan Stankievič (1891–1976), Belarusian-American linguist, historian and philosopher
 Kasia Stankiewicz (born 1977), Polish pop singer 
 Mamert Stankiewicz (1889–1939), Polish naval officer
 Nikolai Stankevich (1813–1840), Russian philosopher and poet
 Richard Stankiewicz (1922–1983), American sculptor
 Rob Stankiewicz, American heavy metal band Haji's Kitchen drums player
 Sylwester Stankiewicz (1866–1919), Polish Imperial Russian corps commander
 Yury Stankevich (born 1976), Russian politician

Polish-language surnames
pl:Stankiewicz